George S. Kircher (October 3, 1887 – April 1, 1949) was a longtime baseball figure.

He was born in Louisville, Kentucky. He played in the minor leagues from 1908 to 1918 and in 1921, spending time with the Shelbyville Grays, Maysville Rivermen, Winchester Hustlers, Norfolk Tars, Atlanta Crackers, Nashville Volunteers, Portland Beavers (of the well-regarded Pacific Coast League), Rocky Mount Tar Heels, Richmond Climbers, Fort Wayne Panthers and Meridian Mets. In 1913, he managed the Tars for part of the campaign, replacing Charles Shaffer and being replaced by Ray Ryan.

He was later the head baseball coach at Virginia Polytechnic Institute & State University, skippering the team from 1924 to 1932 and leading it to a combined record of 77-54-7.

He died in Birmingham, Alabama.

Head coaching record

References

1887 births
1949 deaths
Atlanta Crackers players
Fort Worth Panthers players
Maysville Rivermen players
Meridian Mets players
Nashville Vols players
Norfolk Tars players
Portland Beavers players
Richmond Climbers players
Rocky Mount Tar Heels players
Shelbyville Grays players
Baseball players from Louisville, Kentucky
Sportspeople from Louisville, Kentucky
Virginia Tech Hokies baseball coaches
Winchester Hustlers players